Senator Regan may refer to:

Kenneth M. Regan (1891–1959), Texas State Senate
Mike Regan (politician) (born 1961), Pennsylvania State Senate

See also
Senator Reagan (disambiguation)